Queen of Apostles Boarding School (formerly OLA Boarding) is a  public Catholic primary boarding school for girls, located in Elmina, in the Central Region of Ghana. The school is sited on a hill just beside St. Joseph's Minor Basilica, the first Catholic church in Ghana.

The school was established in March 1884 by the Congregation of the Missionary Sisters of Our Lady of Apostles and was the first Catholic school for girls in Elmina.

See also

 Education in Ghana
 List of boarding schools
 List of schools in Ghana

References

External links 
 Facebook page

19th-century establishments in Gold Coast (British colony)
1884 establishments in Gold Coast (British colony)
Boarding schools in Ghana
Co-educational boarding schools
Educational institutions established in 1884
Elmina
Girls' schools in Ghana
Public schools in Ghana
Catholic elementary and primary schools in Ghana
Catholic boarding schools